Collymore is a surname. Notable people with the surname include:

 Clinton Collymore, Guyanese politician
 Corey Collymore (born 1977), Barbadian cricketer
 Frank Collymore (1893–1980), Barbadian author and poet
 Robert Collymore (born 1958) Guyanese-born British businessman
 Stan Collymore (born 1971), English footballer and football pundit